The following television stations operate on virtual channel 13 in the United States:

 K02QW-D in Reno, Nevada
 K03DT-D in Superior, Montana
 K03FW-D in Kenai, etc., Alaska
 K04GW-D in Spearfish, South Dakota
 K04HF-D in Panaca, Nevada
 K04RW-D in Cedar Canyon, Utah
 K05AH-D in Hot Springs, Montana
 K05ML-D in Sula, Montana
 K06JC-D in Chadron, Nebraska
 K06KR-D in Crawford, Nebraska
 K07XM-D in Mink Creek, Idaho
 K07ZG-D in Powderhorn Valley, Colorado
 K08KW-D in Richland, Oregon
 K08LN-D in Harrison, Nebraska
 K09DY-D in Westcliffe, Colorado
 K09EP-D in Grants, etc., New Mexico
 K10NF-D in Halfway, Oregon
 K10PN-D in Cedar City, etc., Utah
 K11FQ-D in Thompson Falls, Montana
 K11IV-D in Pioche, Nevada
 K11JP-D in Plains-Paradise, Montana
 K11TY-D in Salmon, Idaho
 K12QT-D in Trout Creek, etc., Montana
 K12XI-D in Helper, Utah
 K13AV-D in Gunnison, Colorado
 K13LU-D in Ursine, Nevada
 K13LV-D in Caliente, Nevada
 K13OG-D in Rural Juab, etc., Utah
 K13RN-D in Old Harbor, Alaska
 K13RR-D in Tok, Alaska
 K13SA-D in Port Heiden, Alaska
 K13SE-D in Stony River, Alaska
 K13SM-D in Slana, Alaska
 K13SV-D in Pedro Bay, Alaska
 K13SY-D in Birch Creek, Alaska
 K13TD-D in White Mountain, Alaska
 K13TE-D in Bettles, Alaska
 K13TJ-D in Mountain Village, Alaska
 K13TN-D in Manley Hot Springs, Alaska
 K13TR-D in Homer, Alaska
 K13UO-D in Cold Bay, Alaska
 K13UV-D in Napakiak, Alaska
 K13AAI-D in Marysvale, Utah
 K13AAJ-D in Woodland & Kamas, Utah
 K13AAL-D in Beaver etc., Utah
 K13AAN-D in Roosevelt, Utah
 K13AAP-D in East Price, Utah
 K13AAX-D in Redding, California
 K14BF-D in Wenatchee, Washington
 K14IC-D in Burley, Idaho
 K14IU-D in Frenchtown, etc., Montana
 K14PA-D in Rural Juab County, Utah
 K14QX-D in Hatch, Utah
 K15CD-D in Mayfield, Utah
 K15FQ-D in Milford, etc., Utah
 K15HN-D in Bluff & area, Utah
 K15LK-D in Scipio, Utah
 K15LL-D in Leamington, Utah
 K15LZ-D in Tucumcari, New Mexico
 K15MF-D in Raton, etc., New Mexico
 K16BT-D in Orderville, Utah
 K16DR-D in Jack's Cabin, Colorado
 K16GJ-D in Polson, Montana
 K16JD-D in Northome, Minnesota
 K16KO-D in Leadore, Idaho
 K16MN-D in Wendover, Utah
 K16MW-D in Malad City, Idaho
 K17IG-D in Hoehne, Colorado
 K17JZ-D in Bondurant, Wyoming
 K17NX-D in Centralia/Chehalis, Washington
 K18HZ-D in Navajo Mountain, Utah
 K18IA-D in Oljeto, Utah
 K18IB-D in Mexican Hat, Utah
 K18LL-D in Eads, etc., Colorado
 K18MY-D in East Carbon County, Utah
 K19CG-D in Belle Fourche, South Dakota
 K19HU-D in Montezuma Creek & Aneth, Utah
 K19MH-D in Fruitland, Nevada
 K19MN-D in Lake George, Colorado
 K19MP-D in Gallup, New Mexico
 K20IV-D in Baker City, etc., Oregon
 K20JG-D in Salida, etc., Colorado
 K20MS-D in Richfield, etc., Utah
 K20MU-D in Bicknell, etc., Utah
 K20MV-D in Koosharem, Utah
 K20MW-D in Rural Sevier County, Utah
 K20MX-D in Panguitch, etc., Utah
 K20MY-D in Henriville, Utah
 K20NW-D in Laughlin, Nevada
 K21FD-D in Taos, etc., New Mexico
 K21FL-D in Salina & Redmond, Utah
 K21JV-D in Green River, Utah
 K21LY-D in Mapleton, Oregon
 K21MB-D in Scottsburg, Oregon
 K21MX-D in Garfield, etc., Utah
 K21NP-D in Orangeville, Utah
 K22EW-D in Mora, New Mexico
 K22GE-D in Dulce, New Mexico
 K22NA-D in Inyokern, etc., California
 K22NE-D in Myton, Utah
 K22OO-D in Nephi, Utah
 K23KZ-D in Bigfork/Marcell, Minnesota
 K23NI-D in Crescent City, California
 K23NR-D in Mount Pleasant, Utah
 K24MF-D in Florence, Oregon
 K24NM-D in Sargents, Colorado
 K25CG-D in Aberdeen, Washington
 K25GY-D in Beryl/Modena/New Castle, Utah
 K25HJ-D in Hornsby Ranch, etc., New Mexico
 K25HV-D in Truth or Consequence, New Mexico
 K25JJ-D in Fillmore/Meadow, etc., Utah
 K25LF-D in Philipsburg, Montana
 K25OI-D in Soda Springs, Idaho
 K25OO-D in Pendleton, Oregon
 K25OS-D in Thompson Falls, Montana
 K25OU-D in Brookings, South Dakota
 K25OX-D in Hagerman, Idaho
 K25OY-D in Summit County, Utah
 K25PA-D in St. George, Utah
 K26JN-D in Huntington, Utah
 K26KA-D in Drummond, Montana
 K26NK-D in Wichita Falls, Texas
 K26OV-D in Zuni, New Mexico
 K27JY-D in London Springs, Oregon
 K27KH-D in Orderville, Utah
 K27KX-D in Las Animas, Colorado
 K27MM-D in Tendoy/Leadore, Idaho
 K28GM-D in Rural Garfield County, Utah
 K28HL-D in Riverton, Wyoming
 K28JC-D in Enterprise, Oregon
 K28JK-D in Huntsville/Liberty, Utah
 K28JL-D in Morgan, etc., Utah
 K28JS-D in Samak, Utah
 K28KC-D in Canon City, Colorado
 K28KJ-D in Chelan, Washington
 K28KP-D in Clear Creek, Utah
 K28OS-D in Logan, Utah
 K28PI-D in Emery, Utah
 K29EM-D in Manti & Ephraim, Utah
 K29GJ-D in Tropic & Cannonville, Utah
 K29HN-D in Escalante, Utah
 K29HX-D in Wanship, Utah
 K29JQ-D in Fishlake Resort, Utah
 K29KT-D in Thoreau, New Mexico
 K29LN-D in Santa Rosa, New Mexico
 K29LZ-D in Fountain Green, Utah
 K29MC-D in Heber City, Utah
 K29MN-D in Fillmore, etc., Utah
 K29MT-D in Scofield, Utah
 K30BU-D in Leadore, Idaho
 K30EJ-D in Crested Butte, Colorado
 K30GL-D in Many Farms, Arizona
 K30JG-D in Randolph & Woodruff, Utah
 K30KG-D in Coalville, etc., Utah
 K30KU-D in Silver City, New Mexico
 K30MH-D in Overton, Nevada
 K30OA-D in Milton-Freewater, Oregon
 K30OJ-D in Las Vegas, New Mexico
 K30OV-D in Boulder, Utah
 K30PE-D in Parowan, Enoch etc., Utah
 K30PG-D in Delta/Oak City, etc, Utah
 K30PN-D in Green River, Utah
 K30PP-D in Ferron, Utah
 K30PW-D in Salmon, Idaho
 K30QD-D in Ontario, etc., Oregon
 K31KN-D in Caineville, Utah
 K31MA-D in Big Falls, Minnesota
 K31OY-D in Pahrump, Nevada
 K32HN-D in Circleville, etc., Utah
 K32IX-D in Lihue, Hawaii
 K32JZ-D in Kabetogama, Minnesota
 K33KJ-D in Crested Butte, Colorado
 K33LV-D in Henefer, etc., Utah
 K33PL-D in Birchdale, Minnesota
 K33PQ-D in Manila, etc, Utah
 K33QF-D in Holbrook, Idaho
 K34NG-D in La Grande, Oregon
 K34NM-D in Lamar, Colorado
 K34NT-D in Hanksville, Utah
 K34OH-D in Montpelier, Idaho
 K34PA-D in Garrison, etc., Utah
 K35CK-D in Price, Utah
 K35HB-D in Deming, New Mexico
 K35JR-D in Arrey & Derry, New Mexico
 K35NE-D in Fremont, Utah
 K35NZ-D in Ninilchick, Alaska
 K35OP-D in Park City, Utah
 K36AK-D in Blanding/Monticello, Utah
 K36BQ-D in Pahrump, Nevada
 K36GQ-D in Parlin, Colorado
 K36IM-D in Duchesne, etc., Utah
 K36JB-D in Cripple Creek, Colorado
 K36KZ-D in Max, Minnesota
 K36PA-D in Kanarraville, etc., Utah
 K36PK-D in Peoa, etc., Utah
 K38EC-D in Eagles Nest, New Mexico
 K38MK-D in Cheyenne Wells, Colorado
 K40IX-D in Antimony, Utah
 K40JM-D in Kanab, Utah
 K44FU-D in Long Valley Junction, Utah
 K46IP-D in Cottage Grove, Oregon
 K47MY-D in Red Lake, Minnesota
 K48GV-D in Laketown, etc., Utah
 K49BU-D in International Falls, Minnesota
 KAFT in Fayetteville, Arkansas
 KCOP-TV in Los Angeles, California
 KCOS in El Paso, Texas
 KCPQ in Tacoma, Washington
 KCWY-DT in Casper, Wyoming
 KECI-TV in Missoula, Montana
 KEET in Eureka, California
 KERA-TV in Dallas, Texas
 KETA-TV in Oklahoma City, Oklahoma
 KFME in Fargo, North Dakota
 KFPH-DT in Flagstaff, Arizona
 KGWR-TV in Rock Springs, Wyoming
 KHGI-TV in Kearney, Nebraska
 KHNL in Honolulu, Hawaii
 KHTM-LD in Lufkin, Texas
 KIPT in Twin Falls, Idaho
 KKEY-LP in Bakersfield, California
 KKRP-LD in St. George, Utah
 KLBK-TV in Lubbock, Texas
 KLTM-TV in Monroe, Louisiana
 KOLD-TV in Tucson, Arizona
 KOVR in Stockton, California
 KPSD-TV in Eagle Butte, South Dakota
 KQTA-LD in San Francisco, California
 KRCG in Jefferson City, Missouri
 KRDO-TV in Colorado Springs, Colorado
 KRQE in Albuquerque, New Mexico
 KSFY-TV in Sioux Falls, South Dakota
 KSIX-TV in Hilo, Hawaii
 KSTU in Salt Lake City, Utah
 KTNE-TV in Alliance, Nebraska
 KTNL-TV in Sitka, Alaska
 KTNV-TV in Las Vegas, Nevada
 KTRK-TV in Houston, Texas
 KTVR in La Grande, Oregon
 KUPK in Garden City, Kansas
 KVAL-TV in Eugene, Oregon
 KVBC-LP in Reedley, California
 KVBT-LD in Santa Clara, etc., Utah
 KXDF-CD in Fairbanks, Alaska
 KXMC-TV in Minot, North Dakota
 KXXW-LD in Tyler, Texas
 KYLX-LD in Laredo, Texas
 KYMA-DT in Yuma, Arizona
 KYUR in Anchorage, Alaska
 KZAU-LD in Killeen, Texas
 W05AA-D in Roanoke, Virginia
 W11AJ-D in Franklin, North Carolina
 W12AQ-D in Black Mountain, North Carolina
 W12AR-D in Waynesville, etc., North Carolina
 W12CI-D in Hot Springs, North Carolina
 W13DV-D in Crozet, Virginia
 W15DY-D in Marion, etc., North Carolina
 W21CP-D in Gloversville, New York
 W28DA-D in Pittsfield, Massachusetts
 W32EO-D in Tryon, etc., North Carolina
 W32FW-D in Adams, Massachusetts
 W34EP-D in Sapphire Valley, etc., North Carolina
 WBKO in Bowling Green, Kentucky
 WBTW in Florence, South Carolina
 WCMN-LD in St. Cloud-Sartell, Minnesota
 WEAU in Eau Claire, Wisconsin
 WEXZ-LD in Bangor, Maine
 WGME-TV in Portland, Maine
 WHAM-TV in Rochester, New York
 WHBQ-TV in Memphis, Tennessee
 WHO-DT in Des Moines, Iowa
 WIBW-TV in Topeka, Kansas
 WIRT-DT in Hibbing, Minnesota
 WIVX-LD in Akron, Ohio
 WJZ-TV in Baltimore, Maryland
 WLOS in Asheville, North Carolina
 WLOX in Biloxi, Mississippi
 WMAZ-TV in Macon, Georgia
 WMBB in Panama City, Florida
 WMED-TV in Calais, Maine
 WMEL-LD in Grenada, Mississippi
 WNET in Newark, New Jersey
 WNMU in Marquette, Michigan
 WNYT in Albany, New York
 WOCK-CD in Chicago, Illinois
 WORO-DT in Fajardo, Puerto Rico
 WOWK-TV in Huntington, West Virginia
 WPXS in Mount Vernon, Illinois
 WQED in Pittsburgh, Pennsylvania
 WREX in Rockford, Illinois
 WSET-TV in Lynchburg, Virginia
 WTHR in Indianapolis, Indiana
 WTKO-CD in Oneida, New York
 WTVG in Toledo, Ohio
 WTVT in Tampa, Florida
 WVEC in Hampton, Virginia
 WVTM-TV in Birmingham, Alabama
 WZZM in Grand Rapids, Michigan

The following television stations, which are no longer licensed, formerly operated on virtual channel 13:
 K07VH-D in Sargents, Colorado
 K07ZC-D in Ellensburg/Kittitas, Washington
 K10PB-D in Montezuma Creek/Aneth, Utah
 K12OV-D in Shelter Cove, California
 K13UK-D in Kwigillingok, Alaska
 K17GC-D in Pitkin, Colorado
 K17OD-D in Silver City, New Mexico
 K26KM-D in Orr, Minnesota
 K41KZ-D in Chalfant Valley, California
 K42KR-D in Mountain View, Wyoming
 K45GD-D in Romeo, etc., Colorado
 K46HW-D in Preston, Idaho
 KHGI-LD in O'Neil, Nebraska
 KVTV in Laredo, Texas
 W13DU-D in Hardeeville, South Carolina
 WEEJ-LD in Jacksonville, Illinois

References

13 virtual